Kenneth Edward Gentry (January 28, 1961 – April 16, 1997) was an American criminal who was executed on April 16, 1997, for the murder of 23-year-old Jimmy Don Ham. The crime occurred in Lewisville, Texas in 1983, technically Pilot Point. Gentry previously escaped from a Georgia prison in July 1982 and was attempting to throw authorities off by assuming Ham's identity. He had been serving ten years in prison for assault before his escape.

Before his execution, Gentry issued the following final statement: I'd like to thank the Lord for the past 14 years (on death row) to grow as a man and mature enough to accept what's happening here tonight. To my family, I'm happy. I'm going home to Jesus. As the lethal drugs began to flow, Gentry cried: Sweet Jesus, here I come. Take me home. I'm going that way to see the Lord.

His last meal was a combination of butter beans, mashed potatoes, onions, tomatoes, biscuits, chocolate cake, and Dr. Pepper.

See also
 Capital punishment in Texas
 Capital punishment in the United States
 List of people executed in Texas, 1990–1999

External links
 Birth Index

References

1961 births
1997 deaths
American people convicted of murder
People convicted of murder by Texas
People executed by Texas by lethal injection
20th-century executions of American people
20th-century executions by Texas
People executed for murder
Executed people from Georgia (U.S. state)
Criminals from Georgia (U.S. state)
People from Cartersville, Georgia